Slaughter High is a 1986 slasher film written and directed by George Dugdale, Mark Ezra and Peter Litten, and starring Caroline Munro, Simon Scuddamore, Carmine Iannaconne, Donna Yeager, and Sally Cross. An international co-production between the United States and the United Kingdom, the film follows a group of adults responsible for a prank gone wrong on April Fool's Day who are invited to a reunion at their defunct high school where a masked killer awaits inside.

Though set in an American high school, Slaughter High was filmed in England under the working title April Fool's Day. The film was re-titled after it was discovered that Paramount Pictures had a slasher film of the same name scheduled for release that same year.

Slaughter High was given a limited theatrical release in the United States on November 14, 1986. The release expanded over the following months, and the film continued to screen through the spring of 1987.

Plot
High school outcast Marty Rantzen is seduced by popular girl Carol in the women's locker room. This is revealed as a prank as several students appear and mock Marty's naked body. Led by troublemaker Skip, the students physically abuse Marty before the coach intervenes. Later, two of the students feign remorse and offer Marty marijuana laced with something to make him sick. Skip messes with Marty's science project, accidentally setting off a chain of events ending with Marty being doused with nitric acid, disfiguring him.

Carol meets Skip and the others at their high school reunion ten years later. They find they were the only ones invited, with the school long-vacant and in disrepair. They decide to break in and party, and unbeknownst to them, the school's caretaker is killed by a man wearing a jester hat and an old man mask, the same ones Skip wore during the shower prank. Soon the friends begin dying in a variety of ways – Ted's stomach explodes upon drinking an acid-laced beer, Shirley is melted with acid while taking a bath, Carl is impaled while trying to escape in a car, Susan is killed off-screen, Joe is eviscerated by tractor blades, Stella and Frank are electrocuted while having sex, and Nancy is drowned in a cesspit. Skip is hanged by a noose but escapes.

The jester chases Carol throughout the school, and in her panic, she accidentally kills Skip with an axe to the face. Finally, the jester kills Carol with a javelin in the locker room where the initial prank occurred. Removing his mask, the jester is revealed as Marty, who revels in his revenge before he hallucinates and gets attacked by the spirits of the people he just slaughtered and passes out.

Marty wakes up in a hospital where he's recovering, with bandages on his face. A nurse walks in and comments that Marty's skin graft operation was successful. An alarm in his room is activated, and his doctor comes into the room to assist. Just as he does this, Marty switches places with the nurse, killing her.  He turns around and then kills the doctor who has entered the room. Marty then rips off the new skin grafted to his face and stares into the camera maniacally as the movie ends.

Cast

Production
It was originally filmed as April Fool's Day in late 1984 in London, England, and Virginia Water, Surrey on a budget of $2.1 million. However, the title was changed to Slaughter High after the filmmakers had learned of Paramount Pictures's slasher film of the same title scheduled for release of the same year.

Simon Scuddamore, the actor who portrayed Marty Rantzen, committed suicide by drug overdose on November 21, 1984, shortly after production had ended. Scuddamore was just 28 years old and Slaughter High would be his only film appearance.

Release
The film was given a limited release theatrically in the United States by Vestron Pictures on November 14, 1986. The release expanded in February 1987, and again in April; it opened on a total of thirty-eight screens on April 24, earning $90,000 between April 24–27.

Critical response
Kevin Thomas of the Los Angeles Times reviewed the film favorably, noting: "In its primitive way, Slaughter High, is one of the better teen revenge horror pictures", adding that the film "benefits greatly from its authentic setting, a big, old derelict Tudor-style school building in a remote area, gets actually quite scary, yet the special effects are of the darkly comic, Grand Guignol variety". Terry Lawson of the Dayton Daily News was critical of the performances, particularly the English actors' attempts at portraying an American accent, adding that the film "invites comment as much for its oddness as for its awfulness".

On Rotten Tomatoes the film has a 0% approval rating based on reviews from 5 critics. AllMovie wrote: "Slaughter High gets a passing grade for the die-hard genre fans, but is worthless for most any other audience".

Home media
Slaughter High was released as April Fool's Day on VHS in Japan by Vestron International and on DVD in the United Kingdom by Arrow Video. To date, these are the only countries to have a home-video release of the film under its original title.

The film was released by Lionsgate on April 15, 2009 on DVD as part of their 'Lost Collection', which contains unrated Vestron full-screen VHS master print. It was re-released on January 4, 2011 in a '4-Film Collection' set along with My Best Friend Is a Vampire, Repossessed and Silent Night, Deadly Night 3: Better Watch Out!. Arrow Video released a 'Special Edition' DVD in the United Kingdom in July 2011. Lionsgate released the film on DVD in 2012 in an eight horror film DVD set which also includes Class of 1999, Waxwork, 976-Evil II, The Unholy, C.H.U.D. II, Ghoulies III: Ghoulies Go to College and Chopping Mall.

Under the new Vestron Video Collector's Series line, Lionsgate released the film for the first time on Blu-ray on October 31, 2017.

References

Sources

External links
 

1986 films
1986 directorial debut films
1986 horror films
1980s slasher films
1980s high school films
Adultery in films
American films about revenge
American independent films
American slasher films
American high school films
April Fools' Day
British films about revenge
British independent films
British slasher films
British high school films
Class reunions in popular culture
Films set in the United States
Films shot in England
Films about pranks
Films about bullying
Films about school violence
Holiday horror films
Vestron Pictures films
1980s English-language films
1980s American films
1980s British films